Novy Nekouz is a rural locality (a selo) and the administrative center of Nekouzsky District of Yaroslavl Oblast, Russia. Population:

History
Between 1975 and 1993, Novy Nekouz had the status of an urban settlement. An important poultry farm was founded in the town in 1993.

References

Rural localities in Yaroslavl Oblast
Nekouzsky District